Convoy Range is a broad mountain range in Antarctica. Much of the range has a nearly flat plateau-like summit, extending south from the Fry Saddle and ending at Mackay Glacier. The range has steep cliffs on its east side, but it slopes gently into the Cambridge Glacier on the western side.

The New Zealand Northern Survey Party of the Commonwealth Trans-Antarctic Expedition (1956–58) worked in this area in 1957. The party named the range for the main convoy into McMurdo Sound in the 1956–57 season, with the names of the various vessels being used for features in the range.

Features
Taff Y Bryn is a ridgelike summit capped by dolerite (about 1,600 m), situated 1 nautical mile (1.9 km) west of Flagship Mountain in the Convoy Range. It is named after the River Taff in Wales, the toponym in Welsh literally means "Hill of the Taff." It was named by the 1976–77 Victoria University of Wellington Antarctic Expedition (VUWAE) led by Christopher J. Burgess.

Other geographical features include:

 Alatna Valley
 Barnacle Valley
 Baxter Glacier
 Blorenge Buttress
 Bowsprit Moraine
 Bridge Riegel
 Cambridge Glacier
 Cargo Pond
 Chattahoochee Glacier
 Dory Nunatak
 Dotson Ridge
 Drifter Cirque
 Eastwind Ridge
 Elkhorn Ridge
 Flagship Mountain
 Flight Deck Névé
 Forecastle Summit
 Fry Glacier
 Gentle Glacier
 Glover Hills
 Greenville Hole
 Greenville Valley
 Holystone Slope
 Hopkins Nunataks
 Hurricane Heights
 Irving Glacier
 Larson Crag
 Lugger Glacier
 Mackay Glacier
 Mars Hills
 Matchless Mountain
 Merrell Valley
 Midship Glacier
 Mount Basurto
 Mount Gunn
 Mount Naab
 Mount Schmidtman
 Mount Shadbolt
 Noring Terrace
 Northwind Glacier
 Pascoe Glacier
 Riptide Cirque
 Rum Pond
 Schwall Peak
 Scudding Glacier
 Scuppers Icefalls
 Scuttle Valley
 Sharpend Glacier
 Slackwater Cirque
 Sore Thumb
 Staten Island Heights
 Sunker Nunataks
 Tigerstripe Ridge
 Tillergone Slope
 Toddy Pond
 Topside Glacier
 Tot Pond
 Towle Glacier
 Towle Valley
 Trinity Nunatak
 Voigt Ledge
 Wildwind Glacier
 Wyandot Ridge

References
 

Mountain ranges of Victoria Land
Scott Coast